Rudolf Michael Schmitz (born March 22, 1957 in Eitorf, North Rhine-Westphalia) is a German Traditionalist priest and Monsignor. He is currently the Vicar General for the Institute of Christ the King, Sovereign Priest in the America.

External links

An Excellent Biography of Msgr. Schmitz
The Institute American Homepage
The Institute International Page
Photos From an Institute Ordination
Msgr. Scmitz Interview

References

1957 births
American Roman Catholic priests
Traditionalist Catholic priests
American traditionalist Catholics
Living people